Vassili Vassilyevich Nebolsin (11 June (30 May O.S.) 1898 – 29 October 1958) was a Russian conductor.  He studied at the college of the Moscow Philharmonic and became conductor of the orchestra in 1918.  He became choir master of the Bolshoi in 1920 and its conductor in 1922.  He taught at the Moscow Conservatory from 1940 to 1945.  The Stalin Prize was awarded him in 1950.

Selected discography
Russian operas:
Tchaikovsky: Eugene Onegin. Glafira Joukovskaya (Tatyana), Sergei Lemeshev (Lenski), Panteleimon Nortzov (Onegin), Alexander Pirogov (Gremin), Anatoly Yakhontov (Zaretski), Bronislava Zlatogorova (Olga), Konkordiya Antarova (Filipyevna), Maria Boutienina (Larina), Ivan Kovalenko (Triquet). Bolshoi 1936
Mussorgsky: Khovanshchina, Alexei Krivchenya, Grigory Bolshakov, Nikander Khanaev, Alexei Ivanov, Mark Reizen, Maria Kaksakova, Bolshoi 1950
Tchaikovsky: Mazeppa; Ivanov, Petrov, Davidova, Pokrovkaya, Bolshoi 1952
Mussorgsky: Boris Godunov; Pirogov, Allaxverdov, Kayagina, Verbitskaja, Bolshoi 1954
Napravnik: Dubrovsky Kozlovsky, Petrov, Vervitskaya, Godovkin, Malishev. Bolshoi 1954
Rimsky-Korsakov: Invisible City of Kitezh, Petrov, Bolshoi 1956
Rimsky-Korsakov: Tsar Saltan, Petrov, E. Smolenskaya, E. Verbitzkaya, Bolshoi, studio recording 1958?, released posthumously by Melodiya, 1959.

Foreign operas sung in Russian:
Gounod: Roméo et Juliette, Lemeshev, Maslennikova, Burlak, Mikhailov, Bolshoi 1947
Gounod: Faust, Shumskaya, Reizen, Bolshoi 1952
Bizet: Carmen, Borisenko, Nelepp, Shumskaya, Ivanov, Koziezmia, Duoumanian, Bolshoi 1952

Film:
Mussorgsky: Boris Godunov. Pirogov, Kozlovlsky, Bolshoi 1954 (108 Min.)

Notes

External links
 Bio sketch with photograph

1898 births
1958 deaths
Stalin Prize winners
20th-century Russian conductors (music)
Russian male conductors (music)
20th-century Russian male musicians